The bakshy or bakhshi are traditional Turkmen musicians. Historically, they have been traveling singers and shamans, acting as healers and spiritual figures, and also providing the music for celebrations of weddings, births, and other important life events. They sing either a cappella or to the accompaniment of traditional instruments (primarily the two-stringed lute called the dutar). The Turkmen bakshy tradition is closely related to the larger Turkic Ashik tradition.

See also 
 Music of Iran
 Music of Turkmenistan
 Dutar
 Ashik
 Greater Khorasan
 Turkmen National Conservatory

References

External links 
 Bakhshi

Turkmen music
Oral poets